The 2015 Big West Conference men's basketball tournament took place March 12–14, 2015 at the Honda Center in Anaheim, California. The top eight teams qualified for the tournament. In the semifinals, the highest seed played the lowest seed, with two remaining seeds playing each other. The champion received the conference's automatic bid to the 2015 NCAA tournament.

Bracket

References

Big West Conference men's basketball tournament
Tournament
Big West Conference men's basketball tournament
Big West Conference men's basketball tournament